One More River is a 1934 American drama film mystery directed by James Whale. It was produced and distributed by Universal Pictures and starred Colin Clive, Diana Wynyard and stage actress Mrs Patrick Campbell in one of her very few films. The film marked Jane Wyatt's screen debut. It is based on the 1933 novel of the same title by John Galsworthy.

The novel was the conclusion of a trilogy the Nobel Prize-winner conceived as a supplement to his popular Forsyte Saga, which told of generations of an upper middle class English family through the period when the stability of the Victorian era gave way to the uncertainties and tensions of modernity. Universal snapped up the film rights to this best seller and gave the prestigious project to its star director, James Whale.

Filming from May to July 1934, One More River was one of the first films to be subjected to the exacting censorship of the Production Code Administration under Joseph Breen, which took effect in mid-1934.

A trailer to the film is preserved in the Library of Congress collection, National Audio-Visual Conservation Center.

Plot
Clare, Lady Corven (Diana Wynyard) and Sir Gerald Corven (Colin Clive) are to all outward appearances a happily married upper class British couple. But privately, Lady Clare's husband is physically and emotionally abusive toward her, and one day she can take no more, and walks out of the relationship. Clare books passage on a ship, where she is befriended by a kind and handsome young man, Tony Croom (Frank Lawton).

Although their relationship remains strictly platonic, Tony displays strong feelings for Lady Corven, which are duly noted by a private detective hired by Sir Gerald to keep tabs on his wife. Sir Gerald threatens to paint Clare's relationship with Tony in an unflattering light in court, this being a time when divorce was considered scandalous, especially among England's "privileged" classes.

Cast

Diana Wynyard as Clare Corven
Colin Clive as Sir Gerald Corven
Frank Lawton as Tony Croom
Mrs Patrick Campbell as Lady Mont
Jane Wyatt as Dinny Charwell
Reginald Denny as David Dornford
C. Aubrey Smith as General Charwell
Henry Stephenson as Sir Lawrence Mont
Lionel Atwill as Brough
Alan Mowbray as Forsythe
Kathleen Howard as Lady Charwell
Gilbert Emery as The Judge
E. E. Clive as Chayne
Robert Greig as Blore
Tempe Pigott as Mrs. Purdy

Reception
In a contemporary review, The New York Times wrote, "R. C. Sherriff and James Whale, who distinguished themselves as a team by their skillful handling of the film of H. G. Wells's book, "The Invisible Man", have fashioned a grand picture out of the late John Galsworthy's last novel."

More recently, Chris Fujiwara wrote on TCM.com, "One More River was released in August 1934 to great critical enthusiasm, which was not matched by popular interest. The mediocre box-office performance of the film, together with its genteel tone and its detailed concentration on the texture of social interaction, helped doom the film to undeserved neglect. It has rarely been revived and has received little attention from critics or historians, except in the context of auteurist appreciation of Whale's career. One More River needs rediscovery." Interest in Mrs. Patrick Campbell, and her relationship with George Bernard Shaw, can also spark topicality on the film.

Film historian William K. Everson considered the film "by far Hollywood's most successful attempt at putting any aspect of England on the screen." Everson wrote: "Perhaps as an Englishman I am nostalgically over-enthusiastic because I have never seen such a convincing and 'right' Hollywood film about England ... Perhaps I am also nostalgically enthusiastic because of its pleasing, gentle, civilized reflection of an England that is largely no more"...In its visual style, the film confirms Whale's immense talent, still too little known apart from Frankenstein (1931), The Old Dark House, The Invisible Man, and Bride of Frankenstein (1935). Colin Clive's first appearance, in a series of four shots that showcase his stiff swagger and superior scowl, is as devastating an entrance as any ever accorded a screen villain. The courtroom sequence is an astounding piece of filmmaking, with Whale's elaborately mobile camera accentuating the vastness of the space and setting off the rich contrasts in acting styles among the participants."

References

External links

Films based on works by John Galsworthy
1934 films
American black-and-white films
Films directed by James Whale
Films based on British novels
American drama films
Films set in London
Films set in Oxfordshire
Universal Pictures films
Films about marriage
1934 drama films
1930s American films